Facing Mount Kenya, first published in 1938, is an anthropological study of the Kikuyu people of central Kenya. It was written by native Kikuyu and future Kenyan president Jomo Kenyatta. Kenyatta writes in this text, "The cultural and historical traditions of the Gikuyu people have been verbally handed down from generation to generation. As a Gikuyu myself, I have carried them in my head for many years, since people who have no written records to rely on learn to make a retentive memory do the work of libraries."

The book's introduction was written by anthropologist Bronisław Malinowski, who mentored Kenyatta while both were at the London School of Economics. Malinowski wrote, 'As a first-hand account of a representative African culture, as an invaluable document in the principles underlying culture-contact and change and as a personal statement of the new outlook of a progressive African, this book will rank as a pioneering achievement of outstanding merit.'

The book was banned in Ireland.

Book sections
 Tribal Origin and Kinship System
 The Gikuyu System of Land Tenure
 Economic Life
 Industries
 System of Education
 Initiation of Boys and Girls
 Sex Life among Young People
 Marriage System
 The Gikuyu System of Government
 Religion and Ancestor Worship
 The New Religion in East Africa
 Magical and Medical Practices
 Conclusion

References

Heinemann Kenya Ltd

External links
A brief summary of the book
Chapter 6

Anthropology books
Kenyan books
Jomo Kenyatta
Secker & Warburg books